The 1924 Wightman Cup was the 2nd edition of the Wightman Cup, the annual women's team tennis competition between the United States and Great Britain. It was held at the All England Lawn Tennis and Croquet Club in Wimbledon, London in the United Kingdom. Great Britain defeated the visiting United States team, winning their first title.

Result

See also
 1924 Davis Cup

References

Wightman Cups by year
Wightman Cup
Wightman Cup
Wightman Cup
Wightman Cup